Robert Wilfred Paulson,  (born 1958) is a former Commissioner of the Royal Canadian Mounted Police. He retired from the RCMP at the end of June 2017.

Life and career
Paulson was born in Lachute, Quebec in 1958. His father was an Icelandic Canadian from Winnipeg whereas his mother was French Canadian. Growing up, he was a member of Cadets Canada. Paulson's older brother was a Commissioned Officer in the Royal Canadian Navy.

RCAF career (1975-1984)
Paulson joined the Royal Canadian Air Force as a Pilot after high school, serving from 1977 - 1984. He worked as a flight instructor and aviation administrator at CFB Moose Jaw and CFB North Bay. He left the Canadian Forces in 1984.

RCMP career (1986-2017)
Following his military career, Paulson spent two years at Simon Fraser University in Burnaby and then joined the Royal Canadian Mounted Police as a Cadet in 1986. Paulson's first posting was to the Chilliwack RCMP Detachment. He spent the next 19 years in various RCMP postings in British Columbia before being transferred to National Headquarters in Ottawa.

From November 2010 to November 2011 Paulson served as the Deputy Commissioner for Federal Policing.

On 21 November 2011 Paulson was promoted to Commissioner, one month following the release of his predecessor's recommendations about the Mayerthorpe killing spree.

In December 2013 Paulson refused to comment on proposed changes to the way police deal with marijuana offences. He was quoted as saying "I'm a simple country cop, you know? I'm in the business of policing and others are in the business of policy and law". However, the following year he opined "The people that use drugs are not the people we got to be bothering, right? We've got to be sort of helping them."

As per RCMP memo RCMP Paulson retired on 30 June 2017, one week before his glacial rollout of the C8 carbine was the crux in the Canadian Labour Code trial of the RCMP over the 2015 Bourque killing spree. The result of the trial was the conviction of the organization led by Paulson for close to seven years.

Awards

References

External links 
 RCMP biography
 His award of Order of Merit of the Police Forces - Governor General of Canada's website

1958 births
Anglophone Quebec people
Living people
People from Lachute
Royal Canadian Mounted Police commissioners
Simon Fraser University alumni